Maria Bergamas (23 January 1867 – 22 December 1953) was an Italian woman who was chosen to represent all Italian mothers who had lost a son during World War I not knowing where he was buried.

Life 
Maria Bergamas was born on 23 January 1867 in  Gradisca d'Isonzo and lived in Trieste, where she had moved in her youth, and where she resided at the outbreak of the World War I.

At the time, both Gradisca d'Isonzo and Trieste were an integral part of the Austro-Hungarian Empire, so her son Antonio was drafted into the Austrian army. In 1916 Antonio defected, fled to Italy, and volunteered in the 137th Infantry Regiment of the Barletta Brigade under the name of Antonio Bontempelli, a false identity imposed by the Royal Italian Army to accommodate the irredentists among his ranks. While leading the attack of his platoon, during a fight at the foot of Monte Cimone di Tonezza, on 16 June 1916, Antonio was killed by a barrage from a machine gun. At the end of the battle, a note was found in his pockets in which he begged to inform the mayor of San Giovanni al Natisone, the only person aware of his real identity, of the death. The body of Antonio Bergamas was therefore recognized and buried along with the others who fell in the war cemetery of Marcesina on the Sette Comuni Plateau. However, following a violent bombing that destroyed the cemetery, Bergamas and the comrades who died with him were officially missing.

After the war, Maria was commissioned to choose the body of a soldier from eleven bodies of unidentifiable fallen, gathered in different areas of the front. On October 28, 1921, in the Basilica of Aquileia, the woman was placed in front of the eleven coffins lined up: she laid the shawl on the second coffin and, after passing in front of the first, failed to continue the reconnaissance and collapsed on the ground in front of the tenth coffin screaming the name of the son on which, for this reason, the choice fell.

The chosen body was placed inside the Monument to the Unknown Soldier at altare della Patria, in memory of the fallen of the war. The solemn ceremony took place on 4 November 1921.

According to the testimony of her daughter Anna, the mother was determined to choose the eighth or ninth coffin, since those were the numbers that recalled the birth and death of Antonio; but when she came before the coffins she felt a sense of shame, and since nothing reminded her son, she chose the tenth so that the symbol that would go to Rome was indeed an unknown soldier.

Bergamas died in Trieste on 22 December 1953. The following year, on 3 November 1954, her body was exhumed and buried in the war cemetery of Aquileia behind the basilica, near the bodies of the other 10 unknown soldiers.

See also 
 Edward F. Younger, the American soldier who chose the body of unknown soldier of United States of America.
 Tomb of the Unknown Soldier (Italy)

References 

1867 births
1952 deaths
People from the Province of Gorizia
19th-century Italian women
20th-century Italian women